Sir Philip Anstruther, 2nd Baronet of Balcaskie, Fife (1688 – 27 May 1763) was a Scottish advocate and landowner.

He was the eldest son of Sir Robert Anstruther, 1st Baronet, a member of the parliaments of both Scotland and Great Britain. He succeeded his father to the baronetcy and Balcaskie in 1737.

He studied law, was admitted to the Faculty of Advocates in 1711 and was appointed a principal Clerk to the Bills.

He married Catherine, the daughter of Lord Alexander Hay of Spott, Haddingtonshire, with whom he had 7 sons. She died at Balcaskie, 11 February 1759.

He died 27 May 1763 and is memorialized in Abercrombie Old Chapelyard, Fife, Scotland with many other family members He was succeeded by his eldest son Sir Robert Anstruther, 3rd Baronet.

References

Sources
 

1688 births
1765 deaths
Philip, 2nd Baronet
Baronets in the Baronetage of Nova Scotia